Kitay-gorod, also referred to as the Great Possad in the 16th and 17th centuries, is a cultural and historical area within the central part of Moscow in Russia, defined by the remnants of now almost entirely razed fortifications, narrow streets and very densely built cityscape. It is separated from the Kremlin by the Red Square. Kitay-gorod does not constitute a district (raion), as there are no resident voters, thus, municipal elections are not possible. Rather, the territory has been part of Tverskoy District, and the Central Administrative Okrug authorities have managed the area directly since 2003.

Destruction during the Soviet era
All 10 chapels, 7 out of 18 parish churches, the Cathedral of the Nikolo-Greek Monastery, and two monastery bell towers were demolished in Kitay-gorod in the 1920s and 1930s by the Soviet government. After the destruction of the ancient wall with fortress towers, Kitay-gorod lost its borders and outlines. And in the mid-30s, with the renaming of the main streets after communist revolutionaries and politicians, the ancient toponymy of Kitay-gorod was also destroyed.
 
Fortunately, history itself did not allow time to inflict even more grievous wounds in the very heart of Moscow. The last pre-war victim of Kitay-gorod was the Kazan Cathedral, demolished in 1936, which stood on the corner of Nikolskaya Street and the Red Square.

Starting from 1990, the original names of the streets were restored, but most of the cultural heritage cannot be rebuilt.

Etymology 
Beside Kitay-gorod in Moscovia in ancient Russia, Kitay was also a name for a sea. A sea called Kitay exists in Odessa in Ukraine. Older sources said that people with darker skin than other ethnic groups of Russia sold goods and traded with other peoples in the area of the Kitay sea. 

Kita (pl. kity) is a somewhat obsolete word for "plait" or "an item made by braiding". A 17th-century Russian source states "У шапок янычары имели киты" ("U shapok yanychary imeli kity"), meaning "The Janissaries had braids hanging from their caps". In his 1967 book Rise of Russia, author Robert Wallace asserts that the term might mean a rough-hewn defensive bulwark made from woven wicker baskets filled with earth or rock – and thus Kitay-gorod means "Basket city". Kitay could also be derived from an old word for the wooden stakes used in construction of the quarter's walls. Gorod is simply the Russian word for "city", derived from the ancient gord.

Kitay (Russian: Китай) is also the modern Russian name for China, and cognates with the historic Khitan people of northeastern China. Kitay cognates with the English Cathay.

Walls

The walls were erected from 1536 to 1539 by an Italian architect known under the Russified name Petrok Maly and originally featured 13 towers and six gates. They were as thick as they were high, the average being six meters in both dimensions. 

All of the towers were demolished in the 1930s by the Soviet regime as part of Stalin's grand reconstruction of Moscow, with only small portions of the wall surviving that period. One of the two remaining parts of the wall is located in Zaryadye and the other near the exit from the Okhotny Ryad station of Moscow Metro behind the Hotel Metropol.

Recently the mayor of Moscow announced plans for a full-scale restoration of the wall. City officials also plan to close Kitay-gorod to automobile traffic. Since 1995 the wall has been partially rebuilt, and a new tower has been added. Inside the tower are a couple of restaurants and bars.

Squares
Apart from the Red Square, the quarter is bordered by the chain of Central Squares of Moscow, notably "Theater Square" (named for its eponymous location in front of the Bolshoi Theatre), Lubyanka Square (in front of the KGB headquarters), and Slavyanskaya Square. Bourse Square on Ilyinka Street is situated entirely within Kitay-gorod.

Architecture

Kitay-gorod, developing as a trading area, was known as the most prestigious business area of Moscow. Its three main streets — Varvarka, Ilyinka, and Nikolskaya — are lined with banks, shops, and storehouses like the historicistic shopping mall GUM which confines Kitay-gorod towards Red Square.

One of the most beautiful churches in Moscow, St. Nicholas Church on the Ilyinka (1680–89), informally known as the Great Cross, was a landmark in Kitay-gorod but was destroyed in 1933 on Stalin's orders. This district also features the Church of Cosmas and Damian and the Trinity Church of Nikitniki, which today is nestled among city buildings.  It was built in the 1630s on the land of Moscow merchant, Grigory Nikitnikov.

Nikolskaya Street is famous for being the site of Moscow's first university, the Slavic Greek Latin Academy, housed in extant Zaikonospassky monastery (1660s). Another monastery cathedral, the main church of Epiphany Monastery (1690s), stands in the middle of Kitay-gorod in the eponymous Bogoyavlensky Lane. The 18th century survives in the exterior walls of the otherwise rebuilt Gostiny Dvor (Guest Merchant's Court) by Giacomo Quarenghi.

In the 19th century, Red Square was lined by a neoclassical domed structure of Upper Trade Rows by Joseph Bove. In the 1890s it replaced with the new, eclectic Upper Trading Rows (by Alexander Pomerantsev and Vladimir Shukhov) and the similar Middle Trading Rows (by Roman Klein). The rest of Kitay-gorod was densely filled with offices, warehouses and hotels, to the point where real estate developers had to build streets, not buildings – like the Tretyakovsky Proyezd project by Pavel Tretyakov and Alexander Kaminsky.

Also in the 1890s, developers consolidated large land lots on the perimeter of Kitay-gorod. Savva Mamontov launched an ambitious civic center, built around an opera hall, which was completed as  the Metropol Hotel in 1907, the largest early Art Nouveau building in Moscow, containing artwork by Mikhail Vrubel, Alexander Golovin and Nikolai Andreev. The eastern segment (Staraya Square) was rebuilt by the Moscow Merchant Society, with the late Art Nouveau Boyarsky Dvor offices (by Fyodor Schechtel) and the neoclassical 4, Staraya Square (by Vladimir Sherwood, Jr., 1912–1914) which housed the Central Committee of the Communist Party after the Bolshevik Revolution.

The present-day offices and clock tower of Constitutional Court of Russia were financed by the Northern Insurance Society (1910–1912) and built by Ivan Rerberg, Marian Peretiatkovich and Vyacheslav Oltarzhevsky; this project is also notable as the first professional employer of young Ilya Golosov.

Zaryadye

A whole quarter of Kitay-gorod adjacent to the Moskva River and known as Zaryadye was demolished in three rounds (1930s, late 1940s, 1960s) by the Soviet regime, sparing only those structures that were deemed "historic monuments" by Joseph Stalin. These include the Cathedral of the Sign (1679–84), the Church of All Saints (1680s), St. George's Church on Pskov Hill (1657), St. Maksim's Church (1698), St. Anna's Church at the Corner (1510s), St. Barbara's Church (1796–1804), the Old English Embassy (1550s), and the 16th century Romanov boyar residence. There is no other such cluster of old edifices left anywhere else in Moscow. The district's main structure, Rossiya Hotel (built in 1967), was dismantled in 2007 to make space for the new Zaryadye Park which was opened in 2017.

Gallery

References

 
Tverskoy District
Administrative divisions of Moscow
Art Nouveau architecture in Moscow
Tourist attractions in Moscow
Economy of Moscow
Shopping districts and streets in Russia
Financial districts in Russia
Central business districts in Russia
Demolished buildings and structures in Moscow